Veps may refer to:
Veps (band), an indie pop band from Oslo, Norway
Vepsians, a Finno-Ugric people of northwest Russia
Veps language, the language spoken by the Vepsians
Veps National Volost
Veps Upland

See also
VEP (disambiguation)

Language and nationality disambiguation pages